The Reverend Isaac Williams (1802–1865) was a prominent member of the Oxford Movement (or "Tractarians"), a student and disciple of John Keble and, like the other members of the movement, associated with Oxford University. A prolific writer, Williams wrote poetry and prose including the well known Tract: "On Reserve in Communicating Religious Knowledge".

Life
Williams was the son of a Welsh Chancery barrister who spent much of his time in London. The Williams family had a home, Cwmcynfelin, in Llangorwen, Cardiganshire, from which Isaac would walk to Oxford and other destinations. He is associated with the establishment there of a distinct parish separated from that of Llanbadarn Fawr. He was educated at Harrow School and Trinity College, Oxford, where as an undergraduate he gained the Latin verse prize and thus came to the notice of John Keble.

In 1829 he was ordained as curate of Windrush, a Gloucestershire village not far from John Keble's home at Fairford. He then returned to Oxford to assist John Henry Newman, a leading member of the Tractarians, as his curate at St Mary's Church, Oxford. In spite of a poor degree he was elected as a fellow and tutor at his Oxford college. In 1836, he served as curate of the chapel at Littlemore.

In 1841, he was suggested as John Keble's successor as the Professor of Poetry at Oxford.  Due to the furore raised by Newman's Tract XC, and Williams' association with the Oxford Movement, the election became a referendum on Tractarianism, the beliefs and writings of the Movement. Williams in Tract LXXX, "On Reserve in Communicating Religious Knowledge" had espoused a distinctly Catholic position. The controversy created became so heated that Williams withdrew his name and James Garbett was given the position.

In 1842 Williams married Miss Caroline Champernowne and the couple moved to Bisley, where he worked as a curate to Thomas Keble. In 1846 he became seriously ill and, although he recovered, he was left practically incapacitated and unable to continue active work in the parish. He therefore moved to Stinchcombe, Gloucestershire, where his brother-in-law, Sir George Prevost, a fellow Tractarian, was the vicar. He lived there until his death in 1865.

Writings
 The Cathedral, or, The Catholic and Apostolic Church in England. (Oxford : John Henry Parker, 1838) 
 The Baptistery, or the way of eternal life / by the author of "The cathedral." (Oxford : J.H. Parker ; London : Rivingtons, 1842-1844)

References

Isaac Williams at Project Canterbury

External links
Papers at Lambeth Palace Library

1802 births
1865 deaths
People educated at Harrow School
Alumni of Trinity College, Oxford
People from Aberystwyth
Welsh Anglo-Catholics
Anglo-Catholic writers
Anglican poets
Tractarians